The 2011 Hawaii Warriors football team represented the University of Hawaii at Manoa in the 2011 NCAA Division I FBS football season. The Warriors were led by fourth-year head coach Greg McMackin and played their home games at Aloha Stadium. They were members of the Western Athletic Conference. They finished the season 6–7, and 3–4 in WAC play to finish in a three-way tie for fourth place. Head coach Greg McMackin resigned at the end of the season due to mounting backlash from boosters and fans.

This was the Warriors last year as a member of the WAC as their football program joined the Mountain West Conference for the 2012 season.

It also began the streak of seven straight losing seasons until 2018.

Schedule

References

Hawaii
Hawaii Rainbow Warriors football seasons
Hawaii Warriors football